Villa Manifesto EP is an EP by Detroit hip hop group Slum Village, released on December 15, 2009 under Barak Records. The EP leads up to their full-length studio album, Villa Manifesto (2010). The EP was preceded by two singles – "Cloud 9" featuring Marsha Ambrosius,  and "Dope Man."

Background
Four years after the release of their self-titled fifth album, the Detroit trio (T3, Baatin, Elzhi) decided to work on another album. After the group's disputes were resolved in 2008, late founding member Baatin reunited with the other group members and worked on the group's long-awaited sixth LP   Villa Manifesto before his death in 2009. The EP A&R by DJ Scrap Dirty (Violator Allstar DJs) serves as a prelude to the album which was released on July 27, 2010.

Track listing

References

2009 EPs
Slum Village albums
Hip hop EPs
Albums produced by Focus...
Albums produced by Madlib